Schur–Weyl duality is a mathematical theorem in representation theory that relates irreducible finite-dimensional representations of the general linear and symmetric groups. It is named after two pioneers of representation theory of Lie groups, Issai Schur, who discovered the phenomenon, and Hermann Weyl, who popularized it in his books on quantum mechanics and classical groups as a way of classifying representations of unitary and general linear groups.

Schur–Weyl duality can be proven using the double centralizer theorem.

Description 
Schur–Weyl duality forms an archetypical situation in representation theory involving two kinds of symmetry that determine each other. Consider the tensor space

  with k factors.

The symmetric group Sk on k letters acts on this space (on the left) by permuting the factors,

 

The general linear group GLn of invertible n×n matrices acts on it by the simultaneous matrix multiplication,

 

These two actions commute, and in its concrete form, the Schur–Weyl duality asserts that under the joint action of the groups Sk and GLn, the tensor space decomposes into a direct sum of tensor products of irreducible modules (for these two groups) that actually determine each other,

 

The summands are indexed by the Young diagrams D with k boxes and at most n rows, and representations  of Sk with different D are mutually non-isomorphic, and the same is true for representations  of GLn.

The abstract form of the Schur–Weyl duality asserts that two algebras of operators on the tensor space generated by the actions of GLn and Sk are the full mutual centralizers in the algebra of the endomorphisms

Example 
Suppose that k = 2 and n is greater than one. Then the Schur–Weyl duality is the statement that the space of two-tensors decomposes into symmetric and antisymmetric  parts, each of which is an irreducible module for GLn:

 

The symmetric group S2 consists of two elements and has two irreducible representations, the trivial representation and the sign representation. The trivial representation of S2 gives rise to the symmetric tensors, which are invariant (i.e. do not change) under the permutation of the factors, and the sign representation corresponds to the skew-symmetric tensors, which flip the sign.

Proof 
First consider the following setup:
G a finite group,
 the group algebra of G,
 a finite-dimensional right A-module, and
, which acts on U from the left and commutes with the right action of G (or of A).

The proof uses two algebraic lemmas.

Proof: Since U is semisimple by Maschke's theorem, there is a decomposition  into simple A-modules. Then . Since A is the left regular representation of G, each simple G-module appears in A and we have that  (respectively zero) if and only if  correspond to the same simple factor of A (respectively otherwise). Hence, we have:  Now, it is easy to see that each nonzero vector in  generates the whole space as a B-module and so  is simple. (In general, a nonzero module is simple if and only if each of its nonzero cyclic submodule coincides with the module.) 

Proof: Let . The . Also, the image of W spans the subspace of symmetric tensors . Since , the image of  spans . Since  is dense in W either in the Euclidean topology or in the Zariski topology, the assertion follows. 

The Schur–Weyl duality now follows. We take  to be the symmetric group and  the d-th tensor power of a finite-dimensional complex vector space V.

Then by Lemma 1

is irreducible as a -module. Moreover, when  is the left semisimple decomposition, we have:
,
which is the semisimple decomposition as a -module.

Generalizations 

The Brauer algebra plays the role of the symmetric group in the generalization of the Schur-Weyl duality to the orthogonal and symplectic groups.

More generally, the partition algebra and its subalgebras give rise to a number of generalizations of the Schur-Weyl duality.

Notes

References 

 Roger Howe, Perspectives on invariant theory: Schur duality, multiplicity-free actions and beyond. The Schur lectures (1992) (Tel Aviv), 1–182, Israel Math. Conf. Proc., 8, Bar-Ilan Univ., Ramat Gan, 1995. 
 Issai Schur, Über eine Klasse von Matrizen, die sich einer gegebenen Matrix zuordnen lassen. Dissertation. Berlin. 76 S (1901) JMF 32.0165.04
 Issai Schur, Über die rationalen Darstellungen der allgemeinen linearen Gruppe. Sitzungsberichte Akad. Berlin 1927, 58–75 (1927) JMF 53.0108.05
 
Representation theory of groups
 Hermann Weyl, The Classical Groups. Their Invariants and Representations. Princeton University Press, Princeton, N.J., 1939. xii+302 pp.

External links 
How to constructively/combinatorially prove Schur-Weyl duality?

Representation theory
Tensors